Sébastien Bosquet (born 24 February 1979 in Dunkerque) is a French team handball player. He played on the France men's national handball team which won gold medals at the 2009 World Men's Handball Championship in Croatia.

References

French male handball players
1979 births
Living people
Montpellier Handball players